The Cedar Grove Rosenwald School near Olmstead, Kentucky is a Rosenwald School that was built in 1928.  It includes Bungalow/craftsman architecture.  It was listed on the National Register of Historic Places in 2002.

It is a one-story  by  balloon-framed building, funded by the Julius Rosenwald Fund.  It served as a schoolhouse until 1946 when it was acquired by the  Cedar Grove Missionary Baptist Church.

References

School buildings on the National Register of Historic Places in Kentucky
School buildings completed in 1928
American Craftsman architecture in Kentucky
National Register of Historic Places in Logan County, Kentucky
Historically segregated African-American schools in Kentucky
1928 establishments in Kentucky
Rosenwald schools in Kentucky